El estudiante is a 2009 Mexican film written and directed by Roberto Girault, and starring Jorge Lavat, Norma Lazareno, José Carlos Ruiz, Jeannine Derbez, Siouzana Melikián and Cristina Obregón. The film depicts the story of a 70-year-old man called Chano, who decides to go to university despite his age.

Plot 
The story takes place in the city of Guanajuato. The story is about a 70-year-old man called Chano who decides to enroll in a university course in order to study literature. Chano tries to break the generation gap using his passion for Don Quixote. He clashes with the different traditions and they all share their dreams and experiences.

Cast
 Jorge Lavat as Chano
 Norma Lazareno as Alicia
 Cristina Obregón as Carmen
 Pablo Cruz Guerrero as Santiago
 Siouzana Melikián as Alejandra
 Jorge Luiz Moreno as Marcelo
 Cuauhtémoc Duque as Eduardo
 Daniel Martínez as Héctor
 Jeannine Derbez as Sofía
 Silvia Santoyo as Lucía
 Raúl Adalid as Jorge
 Sofía Toache as Matilde
 Fernando Estrada as Álvaro
 José Carlos Ruiz as Don Pedro

Production

Filming
The film was shot in well-known locations in Guanajuato city where they worked for 6 weeks.  The scenes inside the university were shot at  Universidad de Guanajuato.

Release 
The limited release of this film happened gradually in 100 locations in Mexico. It was also screened in various film festivals, including the Chicago Latino Film Festival and Latin American Film Festival of Grand Rapids, Michigan.

Reception 
The film won the Mexican film critics award "Diosa de Plata", despite not being nominated in any category by the Academy.

External links
 

2009 films
2000s Spanish-language films
2000s avant-garde and experimental films
Mexican coming-of-age drama films
Mexican avant-garde and experimental films
2000s coming-of-age drama films
2009 directorial debut films
2009 drama films
2000s Mexican films